Attachments is a BBC TV series that ran for two series from 2000 to 2002, a total of 26 episodes. It focuses on a group of young professionals in London that work for an Internet startup company called "seethru" during the dot com boom. The fictional company ran an internet portal website at seethru.co.uk which was updated as the show progressed, and which remained on-line for some time after the end of the second series. The show was criticised by the Broadcasting Standards Commission for including excessive sexual content immediately after the watershed. The show was released on VHS, but has not been released on DVD.

Characters 

Seethru was started by Mike (Justin Pierre) and his wife Luce (Claudia Harrison). Other major characters include site designer Jake (David Walliams), content writer Sophie (Amanda Ryan), nerdy technology expert Brandon (Iddo Goldberg), and Reece Wilson (William Beck) and Will Newman (William Gaminara).

References

External links
 

Seethru

2000 British television series debuts
2002 British television series endings
BBC Television shows
British comedy-drama television shows
Television shows set in London
Television series about computing